The 2010 French motorcycle Grand Prix, officially the Monster Energy Grand Prix de France, was the third round of the 2010 Grand Prix motorcycle racing season. It took place on the weekend of 21–23 May 2010 at the Bugatti Circuit in Le Mans, France. From second on the grid, Jorge Lorenzo overhauled Valentino Rossi who was runner-up, to take the first back-to-back wins of his career.

MotoGP classification

Moto2 classification

125 cc classification

Championship standings after the race (MotoGP)
Below are the standings for the top five riders and constructors after round three has concluded.

Riders' Championship standings

Constructors' Championship standings

 Note: Only the top five positions are included for both sets of standings.

References

French motorcycle Grand Prix
French
Motorcycle Grand Prix